Pappobolus hypargyreus is a species of flowering plant in the family Asteraceae. It is found only in Ecuador. Its natural habitat is subtropical or tropical dry shrubland. It is threatened by habitat loss.

References

hypargyreus
Endemic flora of Ecuador
Vulnerable flora of South America
Near threatened plants
Taxonomy articles created by Polbot